Bit.Trip Runner (stylized as BIT.TRIP RUNNER) is an arcade-style rhythm game developed by Gaijin Games and published by Aksys Games for the Wii's WiiWare download service. It is the fourth game to be released in the Bit.Trip series of games, serving as the successor to Bit.Trip Beat, Bit.Trip Core and Bit.Trip Void, and as the predecessor to Bit.Trip Fate and Bit.Trip Flux.

Gameplay

Bit.Trip Runner is a 2D platformer in which the player takes control of Commander Video, the main protagonist of the Bit.Trip series who had appeared only during cut-scenes in the previous titles. The game is split into three worlds, known as "Impetus", "Tenacity" and "Triumph" respectively, each containing 11 stages and a boss encounter. In each level, Commander Video runs automatically from left to right. To complete a level, the player must input certain commands on the controller, including jumping, sliding and kicking, to avoid or destroy obstacles and enemies. If Commander Video is hit by any object, he is immediately warped back to the beginning of the level and starts running again.

During levels, the player obtains power-ups that upgrade the score multiplier, starting at 'Hyper' and progressing through 'Mega', 'Super', 'Ultra', and finally 'Extra'. As these multipliers are gained, the background music becomes more advanced accordingly, with new melodies being added and modern instrumentation layered on top. Commander Video is also able to collect gold bars distributed through the course of the levels - if all the gold bars in a level are acquired, the player is given access to a short bonus stage based on Pitfall, the famous Atari 2600 game programmed by David Crane.

Development
As the fourth of six Bit.Trip games, Runner was designed as an attempt at "fleshing out the BIT.TRIP universe into a fuller, richer place by showing players what exactly the world looked like: an optimistic and colorful place while at the same time dreary and hostile." The game makes a number of notable changes to the design conventions of the other Bit.Trip games, like a more traditional playable character and a structure consisting of many smaller levels rather than three long ones.

In an early version of the game, Commander Video had a wider arsenal of abilities, some of which were callbacks to Core and Void, but designer Alex Neuse decided to remove the more complicated moves after observing that playtesters were becoming overwhelmed.

The game's soundtrack combines 8-bit music with contemporary genres such as techno and electronica. The independent chiptune band Anamanaguchi contributed some songs to the soundtrack. Meanwhile, to fit with the use of Commander Video as a character, artist Mike Roush created the graphics with a heavy emphasis on eyeballs, providing the locations with a greater personality.

The game was later bundled with the other five Bit.Trip games as Bit.Trip Complete for the Wii in 2011. A Nintendo Switch port was released on December 25, 2020.

Reception

Upon its initial release on WiiWare, Bit.Trip Runner was met with mostly positive reviews. Praised for its aesthetics, catchy soundtrack, and addictive gameplay, the game is seen as an extraordinarily unforgiving title.  At the 2011 Independent Games Festival, it won the award for Excellence in Visual Art, and was an honorable mention for the Seumas McNally Grand Prize and the Excellence in Audio awards.

Sequels
A sequel called Bit.Trip Presents... Runner2: Future Legend of Rhythm Alien was released on PlayStation Network, Xbox Live Arcade and Wii U Nintendo eShop on February–March 2013, and released on Steam on February 26, 2013. It features 120 new levels, 8 playable characters and updated HD graphics.
Another sequel, simply named Runner3, was released for the Nintendo Switch, PlayStation 4 and on Steam in 2018, with planned release for the Xbox One.

References

2010 video games
Linux games
Music video games
Nintendo 3DS games
Nintendo 3DS eShop games
Nintendo Switch games
MacOS games
Platform games
Side-scrolling video games
Single-player video games
Video game sequels
WiiWare games
Windows games
Choice Provisions games
Video games developed in the United States
Independent Games Festival winners
QubicGames games